Kai Ortio (born 23 September 1965) is a Finnish retired ice hockey player and the current head coach of Turun Palloseura (TPS) Akatemia U16, a junior ice hockey team in the U16 Mestis. During his playing career, he played two seasons in the SM-liiga, appearing with HC TPS in 45 games during the 1987–88 and 1988–89 seasons and registering three points (0 goals+3 assists) and 22 penalty minutes.

Playing career 
Ortio developed in the minor and junior ice hockey systems of Turun Toverit (TuTo or TUTO) in his hometown of Turku. At age 19, he made his professional debut with the club's representative team, TuTo Hockey, in the 1984–85 I-Divisioona season.

Ortio went on to play the entirety of his fourteen season professional career in Finland, playing ten seasons in the second-tier I-divisioona and two seasons in the third-tier II-divisioona, in addition to his two seasons with TPS Turku in the SM-liiga. Eight of his seasons in the I-divisioona were spent with TuTo and, during the 1996–97 and 1997–98 seasons, his last active seasons before retirement, he served as the team's captain. The other two I-divisioona seasons were played with Oulun Kärpät in 1989–90 and Forssan Palloseura (FPS, previously FoPS) in 1990–91. In the II-divisioona, he played the 1994–95 season with Lätkä-77 and the 1995–96 season with Uudenkaupungin Jää-Kotkat (UJK).

Personal life 
Ortio's son, Joni Ortio, is an active professional goaltender and his career has included playing in the National Hockey League (NHL), the Kontinental Hockey League (KHL), the SM-liiga, and the Swedish Hockey League (SHL).

Career statistics

Regular season and playoffs

References

External links 
 

Living people
1965 births
Finnish ice hockey defencemen
Finnish ice hockey coaches
Sportspeople from Turku
HC TPS players
TuTo players
Oulun Kärpät players
Naisten Liiga (ice hockey) coaches